Brisaster capensis is a species of sea urchins of the family Schizasteridae. Their armour is covered with spines. Brisaster capensis was first scientifically described in 1880 by Studer.  It is endemic to South Africa.

References 

capensis